Toshio Otsubo (born 26 February 1943) is a Japanese diver. He competed at the 1964 Summer Olympics and the 1968 Summer Olympics.

References

1943 births
Living people
Japanese male divers
Olympic divers of Japan
Divers at the 1964 Summer Olympics
Divers at the 1968 Summer Olympics
Place of birth missing (living people)
Asian Games medalists in diving
Divers at the 1970 Asian Games
Medalists at the 1970 Asian Games
Asian Games silver medalists for Japan
20th-century Japanese people